Chathangottunada is a small village in Calicut district. It is located in Kavilumpara panchayath. Wayanad Road (which connects Kuttiyadi and Mananthavady) goes through the town. A. J. John Memorial High School, one of the oldest education schools, is located here. Nearby towns include Thottilpalam and Kuttiyadi. The village's residents include Hindus, Christians and Muslims. The principal political parties are CPI(M), Kerala Congress (M) and IUML

Villages
Some of the small villages include: Nagampara, Cheethapattu, Chappenthottam, Koodalil, Poothampara, and Pattyadu.

Education Institutions in Chathangottunada

A. J. John Memorial High School (A. J. J. M. H. S.) is a high school located here. It is named after A. J. John, Anaparambil. It is managed by the Missionary Congregation of the Blessed Sacrament (or MCBS Sabha). It is an aided school, and hence run by government funding. Government, however, has no role in the management of this school since in Kerala there is a system where the government funds schools, but all expenditures go to private and religious management.

Transportation
Chathangottunada village connects to other parts of India through Vatakara town on the west and Kuttiady town on the east.  National highway No.66 passes through Vatakara and the northern stretch connects to Mangalore, Goa and Mumbai.  The southern stretch connects to Cochin and Trivandrum.  The eastern National Highway No.54 going through Kuttiady connects to Mananthavady, Mysore and Bangalore. The nearest airports are at Kannur and Kozhikode.  The nearest railway station is at Vatakara.

References

Kuttiady area